Damside Windmill (also known as Pilling Windmill and The Old Mill) is a tower windmill in the English village of Pilling, Lancashire. It was built in 1808 by Ralph Slater, builder of similar structures in the area, such as Marsh Mill. An earlier mill was marked here on Yates's 1786 map of Lancashire.

The mill converted to steam power in 1870, and the sails were removed in 1887. It continued to operate until the 1920s, after which it fell into disrepair. By 1975, the mill had been restored for use as a private residence.

Inventor Richard Gornall worked out of a barn attached to the mill in the late 19th century.

See also

List of windmills in Lancashire

References

Bibliography

External links
Damside, Pilling, Lancashire – Windmill World
DEC 2016 – DAMSIDE WINDMILL, LANCASHIRE – Unique Property Bulletin (interior pictures)

Buildings and structures in the Borough of Wyre
Windmills in Lancashire
The Fylde
Tower mills in the United Kingdom
Windmills completed in 1808
1808 establishments in England
Pilling